"Three Marlenas" is a song by American rock band the Wallflowers. It was released in October 1997 as the fourth and final single from their second album, Bringing Down the Horse (1996). The song peaked at number 51 on the US Billboard Hot 100 Airplay chart and number 13 on Canada's RPM Top Singles chart.

Music video
A music video, directed by Big TV!, was produced for the song. Lead singer Jakob Dylan emerges out of an ocean undeterred and walks around a frozen city for the duration of the song.

Track listing
UK CD single
 "Three Marlenas" (edit) – 4:29
 "Three Marlenas" (live on KFOG)
 "One Headlight" (live on KFOG)

Charts

Release history

References

1996 songs
1997 singles
Interscope Records singles
Music videos directed by Big T.V.
Song recordings produced by T Bone Burnett
Songs about prostitutes
Songs written by Jakob Dylan
The Wallflowers songs